

The Bristol BX-200 is an American two-seat cross-country homebuilt monoplane designed and built by Uriel Bristol for amateur construction from plans or kits.

Design and development
The prototype registered N3UB first flew on 15 July 1986 and was a mid-wing monoplane with tubular steel fuselage and wooden wings. The prototype had a fixed conventional landing gear with a tailwheel and was powered by a  Lycoming O-360-A4A piston engine. The enclosed cockpit has two seats side-by-side and room for 50 lb (22.7 kg) of baggage. In general layout, it is similar to the Cassutt Special racer.

In the 1988 Sun 60 Air Race, N3UB was timed at a closed course speed of 219 mph, placing it second in its horsepower class (behind a Glasair RG at 227 mph) and fifth overall.

Specifications (Prototype)

References

1980s United States sport aircraft
Homebuilt aircraft
Mid-wing aircraft
Single-engined tractor aircraft
Aircraft manufactured in the United States